Wilfredo Negron (born November 13, 1973, in Toa Alta, Puerto Rico) is a former professional boxer from Puerto Rico.

Wilfredo began boxing professionally in 1994, and faced a number of tough opponents in his 13-year career, such as Zab Judah, Martese Logan, and Emanuel Augustus.  He has challenged for a number of minor titles, winning the WBA Fedecentro lightweight and light welterweight.  In his one shot at a major title, the IBF light welterweight world championship, challenging Judah, he lost by knockout in the 4th of 12 rounds.

Negron also beat a former world champion, a severely faded Juan Meza, by first-round knockout in Meza's last fight, at age 41 in 1997.

External links 

1973 births
Living people
People from Toa Alta, Puerto Rico
Puerto Rican male boxers
Light-welterweight boxers